Micro-adventure  may refer to:

 Microadventure, an overnight outdoor adventure that is small and achievable
 Micro Adventure, a young adult series of books published by Scholastic, Inc. during the 1980s 
 MicroAdventure!, a 4D film spin off of the Honey, I Shrunk the Kids film series that was shown at Tokyo Disneyland